Patrick William McEnroe (born July 1, 1966) is an American former professional tennis player, broadcaster, and former captain of the United States Davis Cup team.

Born in Manhasset, New York, he is John McEnroe's youngest brother. He won one singles title and 16 doubles titles, including the 1989 French Open. His career-high rankings were world No. 28 in singles and world No. 3 in doubles.

Juniors
McEnroe started playing tennis as a young boy and was taught at the Port Washington Tennis Academy, where his brother John also played.  As a junior, Patrick reached the semifinals of Wimbledon and the US Open boys' singles in 1983. He partnered with Luke Jensen to win the French junior doubles and the USTA Boys' 18 National and Clay Court titles in 1984. He also made his first impact on the professional tour that year, teaming up with brother John to win the doubles title at Richmond, Virginia. He won the men's doubles gold medal at the 1987 Pan American Games with Jensen, and helped Stanford University win the NCAA team championship in 1986 and 1988. While at Stanford, he was a member of the Sigma Alpha Epsilon fraternity. McEnroe graduated from Stanford in 1988 with a degree in political science, and then joined the professional tennis tour.

Professional career

In 1989, McEnroe won the French Open men's doubles title and the Masters doubles title, partnering with Jim Grabb.

His first career singles final came in 1991 at Chicago, where he faced his brother John, who won the match 3–6, 6–2, 6–4. (This was the second time in tour history where two brothers faced each other in a tournament final, after Emilio Sánchez and Javier Sánchez met in the Madrid final in 1987.)

His best Grand Slam singles performance came at the 1991 Australian Open, where he reached the semifinals before being knocked-out by eventual-champion Boris Becker. (Commenting on his fellow semifinalists, he told the press: "It's just like you all expected – Edberg, Lendl, McEnroe and Becker".) He was also runner-up in the men's doubles at the Australian Open that year, partnering with his former Stanford teammate David Wheaton.

McEnroe won the men's singles at the Sydney Outdoor Championships in 1995, to claim his only career singles title. He also had some notable Grand Slam singles results that year – beating Boris Becker in the first round of the Australian Open (before eventually losing in the fourth round), and then reaching the quarterfinals of the US Open where he lost to Becker in an epic four-hour and seven-minute four-set marathon.

McEnroe acted as a catalyst for fellow tennis champion (and older brother John's own rival) Jimmy Connors's run during the 1991 US Open. In the first round of the 1991 US Open, McEnroe led Connors two sets and 3–0 in the third set but Connors came back to win in five sets, walking off the court at 1:35 in the morning, after 4 hours and 18 minutes of play.

McEnroe retired from the professional tour in 1998.

Davis Cup
In the Davis Cup, McEnroe represented his country as a doubles player in 1993, 1994 and 1996, compiling a 3–1 record. In 2000, after older-brother John resigned following an unhappy 14-month spell as captain, he was named the 38th captain of the United States Davis Cup team.

With McEnroe as captain, the Davis Cup team won the Cup for the U.S. in December 2007. He resigned the position of team captain on September 6, 2010. His time as captain is the longest of any US Davis Cup captain.

General Manager USTA Player Development
In 2008, McEnroe became General Manager of USTA Player Development. A series of mandates aimed at promoting junior tennis, including a requirement that all players age ten and under (U10) compete on miniature courts using new lightweight "green dot" tennis balls, have been controversial.  The smaller format is designed to make tennis more accessible to children but critics argue that it will inhibit development. Coach Robert Lansdorp said in September 2013 that the format "is wrong for the very talented players" that become champions and noted that Maria Sharapova, Monica Seles and the Williams sisters were already competing on regular courts by age 7.

In 2012, tennis coach Wayne Bryan, father of the Bryan Brothers, wrote a letter expressing concern about the effects USTA mandates were having on players and coaches around the country. McEnroe responded, calling Bryan's criticisms "scattershot" and "filled with holes, hearsay and half truths". At the December 2012 "Riv It Up" USPTA Education Event held at the Riviera Country Club in Pacific Palisades, California, professional coaches united to support Bryan in a "packed" meeting with USTA director Craig Jones that drew attendees from as far away as Arizona. Fox News commentator Sean Hannity, the father of two junior players, posted his own analysis online "urging the immediate reversal of the USTA's new rules for juniors competition". Former world No. 1, John McEnroe, owner of Sportime Tennis Center on Randalls Island, New York, agrees that the tennis federation his younger brother Patrick advocates is unlikely to produce a champion.

On September 3, 2014, Patrick McEnroe was relieved of his duties as Head of Player Development for the USTA. Jon Wertheim of Sports Illustrated reports McEnroe was "forced out of his job" after a six-year tenure.  The announcement was made during the US Open Tennis Championship in Flushing Meadows, New York, where for the second consecutive year, and only the second time in its 134-year history, no American men advanced past the third round. It is the latest indicator that the United States has lost its place in the upper echelon of professional tennis. The last American man to win a Grand Slam title was Andy Roddick in 2003.

On April 5, 2015, Martin Blackman was announced as the new Head of Player Development for the USTA.

Broadcast career
McEnroe currently works as a broadcaster for ESPN and a contributor to CNN. He previously worked for CBS from 1996 to 2008. McEnroe has worked for ESPN since 1995, where his versatility allows him to work play-by-play, as a studio host, or analyst. He is regularly paired with his brother John or Darren Cahill. Patrick works as the lead play-by-play man for many of ESPN's tennis events.

Personal life
On December 19, 1998, McEnroe married singer and actress Melissa Errico. They have three daughters, Victoria Penny (born 2006) and twins Juliette Beatrice and Diana Katherine (born 2008). They reside in Bronxville, New York.

Honors
 McEnroe served as captain of the US men's tennis team at the 2004 Summer Olympics in Athens.
 In November 2012, McEnroe was announced as a 2013 recipient of the NCAA Silver Anniversary Award, presented annually to six distinguished former college student-athletes on the 25th anniversary of the end of their college sports careers.

Grand Slam finals

Doubles: 2 (1 title, 1 runner-up)

Mixed doubles: 1 (1 runner-up)

ATP Tour finals

Singles: 4 (1–3)

Doubles wins (16)

Doubles runner-ups (21)
 1988: Schenectady (with Paul Annacone, lost to Alexander Mronz/Greg Van Emburgh), Cincinnati (with Jim Grabb, lost to Rick Leach/Jim Pugh)
 1989: Key Biscayne (with Jim Grabb, lost to Jakob Hlasek/Anders Järryd), Rio de Janeiro (with Tim Wilkison, lost to Jorge Lozano/Todd Witsken), Washington (with Jim Grabb, lost to Neil Broad/Gary Muller)
 1990: Indian Wells (with Jim Grabb, lost to Boris Becker/Guy Forget), Rosmalen (with Jim Grabb, lost to Jakob Hlasek/Michael Stich)
 1991: Australian Open (with David Wheaton, lost to Scott Davis/David Pate), Vienna (with Jakob Hlasek, lost to Anders Järryd/Gary Muller)
 1992: Cincinnati (with Jonathan Stark, lost to Todd Woodbridge/Mark Woodforde), New Haven (with Jared Palmer, lost to Kelly Jones/Rick Leach), Brisbane (with Jonathan Stark, lost to Steve DeVries/David Macpherson), Antwerp (with Jared Palmer, lost to John Fitzgerald/Anders Järryd)
 1993: San Francisco (with Jonathan Stark, lost to Scott Davis/Jacco Eltingh), Key Biscayne (with Jonathan Stark, lost to Richard Krajicek/Jan Siemerink)
 1994: Tokyo Outdoor (with Sébastien Lareau, lost to Henrik Holm/Anders Järryd), Toronto (with Jared Palmer, lost to Byron Black/Jonathan Stark), Toulouse (with Jared Palmer, lost to Menno Oosting/Daniel Vacek)
 1995: Key Biscayne (with Jim Grabb, lost to Todd Woodbridge/Mark Woodforde), Tokyo Indoor (with Jakob Hlasek, lost to Jacco Eltingh/Paul Haarhuis)
 1996: Sydney Outdoor (with Sandon Stolle, lost to Ellis Ferreira/Jan Siemerink)

References

Further reading

External links

 
 
 
 Patrick McEnroe's ESPN Bio
 USTA Names Patrick McEnroe U.S. Davis Cup Captain Through 2006 

1966 births
American male tennis players
American tennis coaches
Buckley Country Day School alumni
French Open champions
French Open junior champions
Grand Slam (tennis) champions in boys' doubles
Grand Slam (tennis) champions in men's doubles
Living people
Pan American Games gold medalists for the United States
Pan American Games medalists in tennis
People from Douglaston–Little Neck, Queens
People from Manhasset, New York
People from Oyster Bay (town), New York
Stanford Cardinal men's tennis players
Tennis commentators
Tennis people from New York (state)
Tennis players at the 1987 Pan American Games
Trinity School (New York City) alumni
Medalists at the 1987 Pan American Games
John McEnroe